Citadel is a community in Northwest Calgary, Alberta. It is bordered by Stoney Trail on the north and west, Country Hills Blvd on the south, and Sarcee Trail on the east.

Public transportation in Citadel is provided by Calgary Transit bus route 138 to Crowfoot C-Train Station.

Demographics

Residents in this community had a median household income of $80,085 in 2000, and there were 7.7% low income residents living in the neighbourhood. The neighbourhood is represented in the Calgary City Council by the Ward 2 councillor.

Most common languages spoken by residents include English, Mandarin, Arabic, Persian, French and Russian .

Education
This neighbourhood has two public elementary schools: Citadel Park Elementary School (K-4) and St. Brigid Catholic School (K-9).  After they finished Citadel Park, students would then attend Arbour Lake School. (5-9).  St. Brigid is the other public elementary to junior high school in Citadel, which is part of the Calgary Catholic School District.

References

External links
Citadel Community Association

Neighbourhoods in Calgary